The 2015–16 First Women's Basketball League of Serbia is the 10th season of the First Women's Basketball League of Serbia, the highest professional basketball league in Serbia. It is also 72nd national championship played by Serbian clubs inclusive of nation's previous incarnations as Yugoslavia and Serbia & Montenegro.

The first half of the season consists of 12 teams and 132-game regular season (22 games for each of the 12 teams).

Partizan is left the competition and moved in lower rank, and therefore stayed Bor in the league.

Team information

Regular season
The League of the season was played with 12 teams and play a dual circuit system, each with each one game at home and away. The four best teams at the end of the regular season were placed in the Play Off. The regular season began on 10 October 2015 and it will end on 10 March 2016.

Standings

Results

Play Off
Play Off is played according to the cup system. Champion is received after the final was played. In the semifinals was played on 2 wins, in the Final at 3 wins. Play Off is played from 26 March 2015. to 16 April 2015.

Semifinals
Game 1

Game 2

Final
Game 1

Game 2

Game 3

Bracket

Awards
Finals MVP: Jovana Pašić (180-F-92) of Radivoj Korać
Player of the Year: Marina Mandić (182-F-83) of Vršac Swisslion
Guard of the Year: Sanja Mandić (178-SG-95) of Radivoj Korać
Forward of the Year: Marina Mandić (182-F-83) of Vršac Swisslion
Center of the Year: Nataša Mijatović (191-F/C-89) of Vrbas Medela
Defensive player of the year: Nataša Bučevac (179-F-85) of Radivoj Korać
Most Improved Player of the Year: Katarina Zec (178-G-97) of Crvena zvezda
Coach of the Year: Dragan Vuković of Crvena zvezda

1st Team
SG: Sanja Mandić (178-SG-95) of Radivoj Korać
G: Katarina Zec (178-G-97) of Crvena zvezda
F: Jovana Pašić (180-F-92) of Radivoj Korać
F: Marina Mandić (182-F-83) of Vršac Swisslion
F/C: Nataša Mijatović (191-F/C-89) of Vrbas Medela

2nd Team
G: Snežana Čolić (178-G-92) of Crvena zvezda
G: Jelena Nikpaljević (175-G-94) of Bor
G/F: Tanja Ćirov (181-G/F-81) of Student Niš
SF: Ivana Jovović (185-SF-89) of Vrbas Medela
F/C: Milena Vukićević (188-F/C-80) of Student Niš

Honorable Mention
Tijana Cukić (173-PG-96) of Vrbas Medela
Snežana Bogičević (188-C-90) of Crvena zvezda
Marijana Paunović (188-C-90) of Kraljevo
Bojana Stevanović (180-PF-96) of Radnički Kragujevac
Nataša Kovačević (188-F-94) of Crvena zvezda
Jelena Mitrović (204-C-1) of Novosadska ŽKA
Ines Ćorda (169-PG-95) of Vršac Swisslion
Marina Ristić (168-G-87) of Kraljevo
Rada Vidović (177-G-79) of Slovanka MB
Mina Đorđević (186-PF-99) of Crvena zvezda
Miljana Džombeta (169-PG-94) of Vrbas Medela
Nataša Bučevac (179-F-85) of Radivoj Korać

References

External links
First Women's Basketball League of Serbia at eurobasket.com
First Women's Basketball League of Serbia at srbijasport.net

First Women's Basketball League of Serbia seasons
Serbia
women